Mohammed Abdi Abdulaziz (born 17 June 1958) is a Tanzanian politician who served as a member of the Tanzanian Parliament for Lindi town constituency. He is a member of, and currently the District Secretary for, the ruling Chama Cha Mapinduzi party. In 1989 he received a Certificate in Law from the University of Dar es Salaam.

References

External links
 Parliament of Tanzania website

1958 births
Living people
Chama Cha Mapinduzi politicians